Sam Uzochukwu is a Nigerian academic and expert on Igbo oral poetry.

Life
Uzochukwu was born in 1940 at Ebenato, Nnewi South Local Government Area, Anambra State, Nigeria. After his B.A. Degree in English Language from Obafemi Awolowo University, Ile- Ife (1966), he branched off to Igbo Studies, being aware of the need to explore this hitherto neglected area.
Uzochukwu received his PhD from the University of Lagos in 1981 for a thesis on Igbo oral literature. He stayed at the University of Lagos, rising to become a Professor and Head of the Department of African and Asian Studies. 

He has worked to collect and document Igbo oral poetry, particularly funeral dirges, and published both creative and critical work in Igbo. A Festschrift for him was published in 2008.

Uzochukwu was the first Professor in the entire Mbanese —which is a general name for a conglomerate of five (out of ten) communities that make up Nnewi South Local Government Area of Anambra State. These communities are Ebenato, Ezinifite, Akwaihedi, Osumenyi and Utuh.
In 2019, Prof. Sam launched a Tertiary Education Foundation, and also unveiled his autobiography entitled A Single Palmnut

Works
Mbem Akwamozu [Funeral Dirges], 1985
Akanka, Na Nnyocha Agumagu Igbo [Criticism of Igbo Poetry], 1990
Abu Akwamozu [Songs of Mourning], 1992
Traditional funeral poetry of the Igbo, 2001
Traditional birth poetry of the Igbo, 2006
''A Single Palmnut, The  Autobiography of Prof. Samuel Udezuligbo Uzochukwu, 2019.

References

Year of birth missing (living people)
Living people
Igbo culture
Academic staff of the University of Lagos
Igbo literary critics
Nigerian literary critics
University of Lagos alumni